is a town located in Tokachi Subprefecture, Hokkaido, Japan.

Tokachi has almost year-round blue skies, which results in warm summers and cold winters. In the summer, temperatures reach 30 degrees Celsius and in winter up to minus 30 degrees Celsius. The clear skies in winter make perfect ice skating conditions, and Ikeda is known for producing world class speed skaters. In the 2010 Winter Olympics in Vancouver, a speed skater from Ikeda won a silver medal for Japan. The main industry in Ikeda is producing Tokachi wine but there are also livestock and vegetable farming industries.

Population 

As of April 30, 2017, Ikeda has a population of 6,933. Like many small towns in Hokkaido, Ikeda has a declining population.

Geography 
Ikeda is located in central/East Tokachi. It has an area of 371.91 square kilometres. It is mainly flat, but has some small hills to the North of the town. From these hills can be seen the beautiful Hidaka Mountains on clear days. Ikeda is conveniently close to Obihiro city, which is 25 km to the West. It also has many other nearby towns, Urahoro Cho to the East, and Honbetsu Cho to the North. The Tokachi River runs through Ikeda, separating Ikeda Cho and Toshibetsu ward of Ikeda Cho.

History 
Ikeda is said to have been first settled in 1879 but organised cultivation began in 1896. In 1926 small villages came together, gaining town status and Ikeda town began.

Transportation 
Ikeda is relatively well connected to the rest of Hokkaido by public transport. The Super Ozora express train between Sapporo and Kushiro stops in Ikeda. Therefore, Ikeda has express train links to Sapporo, Chitose, Obihiro and Kushiro. This is especially convenient for accessing New Chitose Airport. There are also local trains to Obihiro (30 mins) and Kushiro (2 hours). The town is also connected to North East Tokachi by local bus which travels between Obihiro and Rikubetsu. By car route 38 is useful for accessing Obihiro and the highway to Sapporo is useful for longer journeys.

Places to visit 

Ikeda has many attractions for visitors, with many locals speaking some levels of English and are very welcoming to visitors. The wine castle houses local Tokachi wines and shows visitors the wine making process. One can also taste the local wines or grape juice produced there. The castle also offers a large shop with many different local foods, drinks and crafts from Tokachi and Hokkaido and a restaurant overlooking the town. Every October Ikeda holds its annual wine festival, drawing visitors from all over Hokkaido. For 4,000 yen, one can sample as much Ikeda wine and beef as they wish. It is a very popular festival and is Ikeda's main event of the year.

Near to the wine castle is Happiness Dairy, a local cheese and ice cream producer. One can see the dairy making process here, or taste the delicious ice cream at the end of the process. The dairy farm is so popular it has been renamed by locals as "Happiness Daily". About 2 kilometres from the station is "Makiba no ie" a campsite with log cabins available for rent. It also has an Italian restaurant which uses local Ikeda produce. In the summer there is also an outside cafe, play area for children and sheepdog shows. Near to the high school is "Spinners Farm" a sheep farm where one can learn to spin his or her own wool or take a wool weaving workshop. Spinners Farm sells good quality wool and local crafts and occasionally also holds art exhibitions. Nearby to Spinners Farm is Moonface Cafe, a cafe and art gallery serving coffee and light lunches. There are also often art exhibitions held there.

Winter Activities 
As the winter is long in Hokkaido, there are many winter activities to keep the locals busy. As the weather maintains good ice skating conditions, there are local free ice skating rinks in the town. There is also an ice curling rink next to the town's community hall. In nearby Makubetsu (5 km) there is a small ski hill. Larger ski hills such as Sahoro and Tomamu are further away in the Hidaka mountains, but by the expressway they are accessible in under an hour.

International Exchange 

Ikeda is the sister city of Penticton, Canada. Every two years there is a visit from students in Canada to Ikeda. They spend a week with local hosts and go to school with local students. There are also two foreign Assistant Language Teachers in Ikeda, who assist local students' English education and help to promote international awareness in the town.

References

External links

Official Website 

Towns in Hokkaido